The Manurhin MR 73 is a French-manufactured, high-end double-action and single-action revolver chambered in .357 Magnum, which is also suitable for .38 Special. It is manufactured by Manurhin and is available in 2.5", 2.75", 3", 4", 4.25”, 5.25", 5.75", 6", 8" and 10" barrel lengths.

Usage
The MR 73 was standard issue to the French Gendarmerie and to some police units including Special Weapons and Tactics teams (RAID, GIGN and comparable units). In 2021, Beretta began to import the MR 73 Gendarmerie and the MR 73 Sport into the United States.

Specifications
Averaging 15 rounds, no group over  diameter with selected ammunition is allowed.

The MR 73 has an adjustable trigger weight in both double-action and single-action modes, a feature found in other high-end revolvers such as Korth and Janz. These adjustments do not alter the strength of the main spring, ensuring reliable primer ignition. This is achieved by use of roller bearings in the trigger mechanism, with extensive hand fitting and polishing of components during assembly. The MR73 requires more than 12 hours of hand-fitting at the factory, making it about 50% more expensive than competing U.S.-manufactured brands.

The revolver can be converted to a 9×19mm Parabellum with a supplied replacement cylinder, taking bullets classified under French law as ammunition of war. Thus, from the early 1980s onward, it was not officially produced.

Cylinder chambers are finished with an impact process that makes them glass-smooth and extremely hard. The factory proof-fires each cylinder chamber with .357 Magnum ammunition which generates 30% more pressure than the C.I.P. maximum allowable pressure for the Magnum cartridge. The factory guarantees that the cylinder will not burst or show any bulging or deformation with .357 Magnum ammunition developing double the C.I.P.  Pmax piezo pressure, meaning the cylinder can withstand , or 43.5 tons per square inch).

The frame, cylinder and barrel of the MR 73 are made from ordnance-certified steel.  Barrels are manufactured by cold-hammering. The rifling is formed during the forging process, eliminating the need to cut rifling as a separate manufacturing step. This creates an extremely hard and microscopically smooth internal barrel surface.

HKS make a speedloader (Model 10A) to use with the .38, .357 and 9mm caliber cylinders.

Variants
A sporting variant called the MR 32 Match is produced in .32 S&W Long. It was first produced in 1985. Other sporting variants are the MR 38 Match chambered in .38 Special and the MR 22 Match chambered in .22 Long Rifle. The Match versions feature only a single action trigger and have an extended rearward rise. This allows the aiming length to be increased without increasing the total length of the weapon, which would have made it exceed the maximum dimensions authorized in certain competitions.

A variant called the Gendarmerie features adjustable rear sights and larger front sights.

Other variants include the MR 73 Sport, MR 73 Gendarmerie, Special Police F1, MR 88, MR 93 and MR 96.

Users

: Used by EKO Cobra.
 
 
 
 : Used by GIGN and RAID.
 
 
  RELA Corps.
 : People's Movement for the Liberation of Azawad
 
 : police forces

Footnotes

References

Literature 
 Revolver Manurhin MR 73 // «Střelecká revue», 11, 1974

External links

 Official Site
 English User Manual
 Modern Firearms—Manurhin MR 73

Revolvers of France
Military revolvers
Police weapons
.32 S&W Long firearms
9mm Parabellum revolvers
.38 Special firearms
.357 Magnum firearms
.22 LR revolvers
Manurhin